Howard Brandt Dickenman, Jr. (born November 9, 1946) is a retired American college basketball coach and the former men's basketball head coach for the Central Connecticut State University Blue Devils.  He was the second-longest tenured head coach in program history.  Previous to becoming the CCSU head coach, he spent fourteen years as an assistant coach for the Connecticut Huskies; the last ten years were as the top assistant under Hall-of-Fame coach Jim Calhoun. His first coaching job was assistant coach at New Britain High School in New Britain, Connecticut, a position he held for three years.

A native of Norwich, Connecticut, Dickenman played collegiately at Central Connecticut State University from 1966 to 1969 as a 6'4" center. He was the first pick of the 17th round of the 1969 NBA Draft by the Phoenix Suns, though he never played in the league. He was recognized as the 1996 Norwich Native Son Award.

Dickenman retired at the end of the 2015–16 season.

Head coaching record
Source:

References

External links

1946 births
Living people
Basketball coaches from Connecticut
Basketball players from Connecticut
Centers (basketball)
Canisius Golden Griffins men's basketball coaches
Central Connecticut Blue Devils men's basketball coaches
Central Connecticut Blue Devils men's basketball players
College men's basketball head coaches in the United States
UConn Huskies men's basketball coaches
High school basketball coaches in the United States
Junior college men's basketball coaches in the United States
Sportspeople from Norwich, Connecticut
Phoenix Suns draft picks
American men's basketball players